101 is a live album and documentary film by English electronic music band Depeche Mode, released on 13 March 1989 by Mute Records. It chronicles the final leg of the band's Music for the Masses Tour and the final show on 18 June 1988 at the Rose Bowl in Pasadena, California.

Band member Alan Wilder is credited with coming up with the album's title; the performance was the 101st and final performance of the tour (and coincidentally also the number of a famous highway in the area). The film was directed and produced by D. A. Pennebaker.

Background and development
The band's original concept for the film was going to be about how Depeche Mode "fit into" the 1980s. After discussions with an "experienced director", they came to the conclusion that the (unnamed) choice was going to do something "too glossy" and that they wanted to present something more nuanced and interesting. At this point, they reached out to renowned documentary filmmaker D. A. Pennebaker. He accepted, but discarded their initial concept, feeling that it was "impossible to examine in an entertainingly cinematic fashion".

Ultimately, the film focused on what Depeche Mode considered to be their strongest selling point—their live performance—as well as capturing the spirit of their fan base. Notably, the film prominently features a group of young fans travelling across America as winners of a "be-in-a-Depeche Mode-movie-contest", which culminates at the band's landmark concert at the Rose Bowl stadium in Pasadena.

The film features performances at the Rose Bowl concert, interspersed with snippets of the band, the "bus kids" and live performances recorded throughout the tour.  The 2003 DVD reissue included more concert footage, but as Pennebaker was "shooting a documentary, not a concert film", a complete record of the Rose Bowl concert does not exist.

Pennebaker used his direct cinema approach, which he described as "letting the camera run as unobtrusively as possible, thereby encouraging events to unfold on their own. [...] You edit more and the film changes every three days, but [the band] were very nice and patient about it."

Pennebaker admitted there was a similarity between Depeche Mode and some of the other artists he'd filmed before (Bob Dylan and David Bowie): "I found the audience very rapt; they were there for that band. Not any band would do. I got the feeling that maybe there was no other band they'd ever go out for again in that assemblage, and it made me take that audience fairly seriously."

Due to the prominence of the "bus kids" in the film, it is widely considered to be the impetus for the "reality" craze that swept MTV in the following years, including The Real World and Road Rules.

In various interviews, DVD commentaries and on their own website, both Pennebaker and collaborator Chris Hegedus have cited 101 as "their favourite" and "the one that was the most fun to make" out of all their films to date.

Reissues

2003 audio reissue
In 2003, Mute Records reissued 101 as a hybrid Super Audio CD (SACD). In essence, the two-disc set contained 101 in three formats—multi-channel SACD, stereo SACD and PCM stereo (CD audio). The multi-channel audio was presented in 5.1 and gave a better representation of the live experience. The SACD was not released in North America.

Due to pressing errors, however, the first run of the set was marred by a mis-encoded multi-channel SACD layer that skipped and was unlistenable on the first disc. The stereo SACD and CD audio layers were unaffected.

As a bonus hidden track, the multi-channel layer also included the full version of "Pimpf".

2003 DVD reissue
In 2003, the film was released as a two-disc DVD with the feature film on the first disc, including a new commentary track with Pennebaker, Hegedus and the band. The second disc contained all-new interviews with Dave Gahan, Martin Gore, and Andy Fletcher, with each interviewed about the solo projects they were working on at the time: Paper Monsters (Gahan), Counterfeit² (Gore) and Client (Fletcher). All three interviews were conducted separately by Pennebaker and Hegedus. Interviews with Daniel Miller, band manager Jonathan Kessler, and three of the "bus kids" were also included. Special bonus features included isolated video footage of the Rose Bowl concert, including previously unreleased footage.

Alan Wilder left the band in 1995, and declined to be involved with the re-release.

2021 Blu-ray reissue
In 2021, the film was released on Blu-ray with upgraded image quality based on 4k scans of the original film, along with previously unreleased footage. A limited-edition box set was also released that includes a book, poster,  and other special content.

Track listing
All tracks are written by Martin L. Gore, except "Just Can't Get Enough", written by Vince Clarke.

LP

Tape a
Side A
 "Pimpf" – 0:58
 "Behind the Wheel" – 5:55
 "Strangelove" – 4:49
 "Something to Do" – 3:54
 "Blasphemous Rumours" – 5:09
Side B
 "Stripped" – 6:45
 "Somebody" – 4:34
 "The Things You Said" – 4:21
 "Black Celebration" – 4:54

Tape b
Side C
 "Shake the Disease" – 5:10
 "Pleasure Little Treasure" – 4:38
 "People Are People" – 4:59
 "A Question of Time" – 4:12
Side D
 "Never Let Me Down Again" – 6:40
 "Master and Servant" – 4:30
 "Just Can't Get Enough" – 4:01
 "Everything Counts" – 6:31

CD

Disc a
 "Pimpf" – 0:58
 "Behind the Wheel" – 5:55
 "Strangelove" – 4:49
 "Sacred" – 5:09
 "Something to Do" – 3:54
 "Blasphemous Rumours" – 5:09
 "Stripped" – 6:45
 "Somebody" – 4:34
 "The Things You Said" – 4:21

Disc b
 "Black Celebration" – 4:54
 "Shake the Disease" – 5:10
 "Nothing" – 4:36
 "Pleasure Little Treasure" – 4:38
 "People Are People" – 4:59
 "A Question of Time" – 4:12
 "Never Let Me Down Again" – 6:40
 "A Question of Lust" – 4:07
 "Master and Servant" – 4:30
 "Just Can't Get Enough" – 4:01
 "Everything Counts" – 6:27

SACD

Disc one
 "Pimpf" – 0:58
 "Behind the Wheel" – 5:55
 "Strangelove" – 4:49
 "Sacred" – 5:09
 "Something to Do" – 3:54
 "Blasphemous Rumours" – 5:09
 "Stripped" – 6:45
 "Somebody" – 4:34
 "The Things You Said" – 4:21

Disc two
 "Black Celebration" – 4:54
 "Shake the Disease" – 5:10
 "Nothing" – 4:36
 "Pleasure Little Treasure" – 4:38
 "People Are People" – 4:59
 "A Question of Time" – 4:12
 "Never Let Me Down Again" – 6:40
 "A Question of Lust" – 4:07
 "Master and Servant" – 4:30
 "Just Can't Get Enough" – 4:01
 "Everything Counts" – 6:31
 "Pimpf" (full version) (multi-channel SACD only)

 Audio available in three formats: two-channel CD, two-channel SACD, multi-channel SACD

VHS
 "101 – The Movie" – 117:00

DVD
Disc one
 101 – The Movie (includes optional audio commentary with filmmakers D.A. Pennebaker and Chris Hegedus, and bandmembers Dave Gahan, Martin Gore, and Andy Fletcher)

Disc two
All songs are isolated live video footage, uninterrupted by documentary footage. Songs with a * are exclusive to the DVD and were not in the VHS film. Footage of "Sacred", "Something To Do", and "A Question of Lust" were lost and not able to be recovered for the DVD, though they were eventually found and restored in 4K for the Blu-ray release in 2021.

 "Master and Servant"
 "Pimpf"
 "Behind the Wheel"
 "Strangelove"
 "Blasphemous Rumours"
 "Stripped"
 "Somebody"*
 "Black Celebration"
 "Pleasure, Little Treasure"*
 "Just Can't Get Enough"
 "Everything Counts"
 "Never Let Me Down Again"

Extras:
 Interview
 Dave Gahan
 Martin Gore
 Andrew Fletcher
 Jonathan Kessler
 Daniel Miller
 Christopher Hardwick
 Oliver Chesler 
 Jay Serken
 "Everything Counts (live)" (music video)

Blu-ray
 101 – The Movie (4K restoration from original 16mm film elements)

Rose Bowl Concert (uninterrupted by documentary footage, also restored in 4K)
 "Master and Servant"
 "Pimpf"
 "Behind the Wheel"
 "Strangelove"
 "Blasphemous Rumours"
 "Stripped"
 "Somebody"*
 "Black Celebration"
 "Pleasure, Little Treasure"*
 "Just Can't Get Enough"
 "Everything Counts"
 "Never Let Me Down Again"

Bonus Videos (all restored in 4K)
 "Everything Counts (live)" (music video)
 "A Question of Lust" bonus performance
 "Sacred" bonus performance
 "Something to Do" bonus performance

The limited edition Blu-ray set also includes:
 The two-disc DVD with its additional extras (the commentary and interviews)
 48-page behind-the-scenes story of the day photo book
 20" × 30" replica of original US theatrical release film poster
 16-page Anton Corbijn Photo Mode book as featured in the original album release
 Download card to access the HD download of the film and the 24-bit audio files of the 101 concert release

Personnel
Credits adapted from the liner notes of 101.

 Randy Ezratty – recording
 Mark Shane – recording assistance
 John Harris – recording assistance
 Billy Yodelman – recording assistance
 Alan Moulder – engineering
 Depeche Mode – production
 Anton Corbijn – cover
 Paul West – cover

Charts

Weekly charts

Year-end charts

Certifications

References

Further reading

External links
 Album information from the official Depeche Mode website
 

1989 live albums
1989 video albums
Depeche Mode live albums
Depeche Mode video albums
Films directed by D. A. Pennebaker
Live video albums
Mute Records live albums
Mute Records video albums